Caff-E-Hill Farm is a historic farmhouse in Readyville, Tennessee, U.S..

The farm was established circa 1859 for James Newton Caffey. Caffey "grew corn, hay and wheat and raised hogs, sheep and cattle." The farm later became a cattle farm, followed by a dairy farm.

The house was designed in the I-house style. It has been listed on the National Register of Historic Places since April 14, 1995.

References

Farms on the National Register of Historic Places in Tennessee
Houses on the National Register of Historic Places in Tennessee
Houses completed in 1859
Buildings and structures in Rutherford County, Tennessee
I-houses in Tennessee
1859 establishments in Tennessee